Alexander De Goti (born August 19, 1994) is an American professional baseball infielder in the Miami Marlins organization. The Astros drafted him in the 15th round of the 2016 Major League Baseball draft and he made his MLB debut in 2021.

Career

Houston Astros
After attending Long Beach State University, De Goti was drafted in the 15th round of the 2016 Major League Baseball draft out of Barry University.

De Goti made his professional debut in 2016 for the short-season Single-A Tri-City ValleyCats, and played 63 games for the club. In 2017, he split the majority of the season between the Single-A Quad Cities River Bandits and the advanced Single-A Buies Creek Astros, also appearing in 5 games for the Triple-A Fresno Grizzlies. Between the three teams, De Goti slashed .236/.341/.356 with 8 home runs and 32 RBI in 109 total games. In 2018, De Goti split the year between Fresno and the Double-A Corpus Christi Hooks, with a batting line of .283/.335/.440 to go along with career-highs in both home runs (12) and RBI (62). The next year, De Goti spent the entire season in Triple-A with the Round Rock Express, hitting .277/.347/.443 with new career-highs in home runs (15) and RBI (70) in 127 games for the club.

De Goti did not play in a game in 2020 due to the cancellation of the Minor League Baseball season because of the COVID-19 pandemic. He was added to the Astros’ 60-man player pool for the 2020 season.  He was invited to Spring Training with the Astros in 2021 but did not make the big league club and was assigned to the Triple-A Sugar Land Skeeters to begin the season.

On April 14, 2021, the Astros promoted De Goti to the majors for the first time.  On April 16, De Goti made his MLB debut as the starting second baseman against the Seattle Mariners.  In the game, he recorded his first major league hit, an RBI single off Mariners starter Yusei Kikuchi.  On April 20, De Goti was removed from the 40-man roster.  In his brief stint, De Goti appeared in 2 games and collected 2 hits in 7 plate appearances.

De Goti returned to the Sugar Land Space Cowboys for the 2022 season.  On August 19, he drove in five runners over three plate appearances in the sixth inning, leading a franchise-record 17 runs scored in one inning.  The feat occurred during the second game of the doubleheader versus the Oklahoma City Dodgers as the Space Cowboys won, 21–4. He elected free agency on November 10, 2022.

Miami Marlins
On December 1, 2022, De Goti signed a minor league deal with the Miami Marlins.

References

External links

1994 births
Living people
Baseball players from Miami
Major League Baseball infielders
Houston Astros players
Long Beach State Dirtbags baseball players
Barry Buccaneers baseball players
Tri-City ValleyCats players
Quad Cities River Bandits players
Buies Creek Astros players
Fresno Grizzlies players
Corpus Christi Hooks players
Round Rock Express players
Sugar Land Skeeters players
Sugar Land Space Cowboys players